The 2010 IAAF World Challenge was the inaugural edition of the annual, global circuit of one-day track and field competitions organized by the International Association of Athletics Federations (IAAF). The series began with a total of thirteen meetings. 

It replaced the 2009 IAAF World Athletics Tour. Most of the thirteen meetings had been part of the IAAF Grand Prix circuit the previous year, with the exception of the ISTAF Berlin (which had been part of the 2009 IAAF Golden League) and the Meeting de Rabat and Brothers Znamensky Memorial (which had been Area Permit Meetings).

Schedule

References

External links
Official website

2010
World Challenge Meetings